Prittlewell railway station is on the Shenfield to Southend Line in the East of England, serving the residential district of Prittlewell in Southend-on-Sea, Essex. The Engineer's Line Reference for the line is SSV; the station's three-letter station code is PRL. The platforms have an operational length for 12-coach trains.

History 
The line from Wickford to Southend including Prittlewell station was opened on 1 October 1889. There was a goods yard handling mainly domestic coal to the north-west of Prittlewell station; the yard closed on 5 June 1967. Electrification of the Shenfield to Southend Victoria line using 1.5 kV DC overhead line electrification (OLE) was completed on 31 December 1956. This was changed to 6.25 kV AC in November 1960 and to 25 kV AC on 25 January 1979.

Prittlewell itself was the original settlement here, until Southend expanded and engulfed it.

Services 

The station is close to Prittlewell Priory and to Southend United's football stadium, Roots Hall. It is currently managed by Greater Anglia, which also operates all trains serving it.

The typical off-peak service towards London is also three trains per hour (one of which calls additionally at ).

The station is now open on a Sunday after the timetable change in December 2019.

References

External links 

Railway stations in Essex
DfT Category E stations
Railway stations in Southend-on-Sea
Former Great Eastern Railway stations
Greater Anglia franchise railway stations
William Neville Ashbee railway stations
Railway stations in Great Britain opened in 1892
Buildings and structures in Southend-on-Sea